The College Widow may refer to:

 The College Widow (1915 film), starring Ethel Clayton
 The College Widow (1927 film), starring Dolores Costello
 The College Widow (play), a 1904 play by George Ade, and basis for later works

See also
 Maybe It's Love (1930 film), starring Joan Bennett, another adaptation of the play